All-4-One is an American male R&B and pop group best known for their hit singles "I Swear", "So Much in Love" and "I Can Love You Like That". The group is composed of Jamie Jones, Delious Kennedy, Alfred Nevarez, and Tony Borowiak, all from the Antelope Valley and Mojave, California areas. The group has sold 69 million records worldwide.

History

Atlantic Records years (1993—1999)
All-4-One's hit "I Swear" won a Grammy Award in 1995 for Best Pop Performance by a Duo or Group with Vocal and enjoyed an eleven-week run at number one on the Billboard Hot 100, as well as a six-week run at number one on the Australian Singles Chart and a seven-week run at No. 2 on the UK Singles Chart. Other RIAA gold-certified hits by the group include remakes of "So Much in Love" (1993), "I Can Love You Like That" (1995), and "Someday" from the soundtrack to Disney's 1996 animated film The Hunchback of Notre Dame.

Post Atlantic (2000—Present)
A rift between their independent label, Blitzz Records, and their major label, Atlantic Records, led to the group leaving Atlantic as well as Blitzz Records after the release of the album On and On in 1999. The shift in labels left the group in limbo for a few years as they contemplated their next move. In 2001, the follow-up album, A41, was released on AMC Records and yielded "Beautiful as U", a top 20 hit on the Radio & Records Adult Contemporary chart. The group's 2004 album, Split Personality, was given an Asia-only release, and subsequently gave them Asian hits with "Someone Who Lives in Your Heart" and "I Just Wanna Be Your Everything". For much of the 2000s, All-4-One spent their time touring Asia, in cities such as Tokyo, Kuala Lumpur, Singapore, Seoul, Bangkok, Shanghai and Sydney.

In 2009, All-4-One released No Regrets on the Peak Records/Concord Music Group label. The album was largely created in-house, with the group doing the writing for the album, and Jamie Jones' production company, the Heavyweights, doing a lot of the production work. The CD produced the Urban Adult Contemporary hit "My Child".

In June 2015, Billboard premiered the first single, "Baby Love", from All-4-One's 20th anniversary album, Twenty+.

In February 2016, All-4-One joined the inaugural "I Love the 90's" Tour with their peers Salt-N-Pepa featuring Spinderella, Vanilla Ice, Coolio, Tone Loc, Color Me Badd, Rob Base, Kid N Play and Young MC.

Solo ventures 
In 2004, Jones released the album Illuminate on Genesis Records.

Kennedy is the co-founder of the esteemed Catalina Film Festival, known as the west coast's version of the Cannes Film Festival. The Catalina Film Festival is a destination festival located just off the coast of Los Angeles on Santa Catalina Island, California.

In 2012, Kennedy released a single he co-wrote titled "My Rose" which peaked at No. 44 on Billboards Hot Dance/Club chart.

In 2016, Kennedy launched his talk show, Flashback Tonight, which interviews celebrities from the '80s, '90s and early 2000s. Guests have included Richard Marx, Rick Springfield, Taylor Dayne, Karyn White, Marla Gibbs, and Coolio.

 Members 
 Jamie Jones (born November 6, 1974)
 Delious Kennedy (born December 21, 1970)
 Alfred Nevarez (born May 17, 1973)
 Tony Borowiak (born October 12, 1972)

 Discography Studio albums'''
 All-4-One (1994)
 And the Music Speaks (1995)
 On and On (1999)
 A41 (2002)
 Split Personality (2004)
 No Regrets (2009)
 Twenty+ (2015)

 Awards and nominations 
 Grammy Awards 

 American Music Awards 

 Other awards 
 Nominated for a Billboard Award for Song of the Year for "I Swear" (1994)
 Coca-Cola Australian Music Awards - Most Popular (1994) 
 Golden Europa - Favorite New International Act (1994)
 Biggest-Selling Single in the Guinness World Records'' for "I Swear" (1994)
 International Song for "I Swear" (1994) 
 Nominated for the Tina Turner Music Prize (1995) 
 Singapo Perfect 10 Music Awards - Favorite New Act (1995) 
 Sang "The Star-Spangled Banner" during Game 3 of the 1996 World Series at Atlanta–Fulton County Stadium in Atlanta, Georgia (1996)

References

External links 
 

Grammy Award winners
Atlantic Records artists
American contemporary R&B musical groups
American boy bands
Musical groups from Los Angeles
Musical groups established in 1993
Vocal quartets
1993 establishments in California
Ballad music groups